Cuatrecasasiella is a genus of flowering plants in the family Asteraceae, described as a genus in 1986.

The entire genus is native to South America.

 Species
 Cuatrecasasiella argentina (Cabrera) H.Rob. - northwest Argentina, northern Chile, Bolivia
 Cuatrecasasiella isernii (Cuatrec.) H.Rob. - Ecuador, Peru

References

Asteraceae genera
Gnaphalieae